Lanttulaatikko or kålrotslåda (swede casserole) is a swede (rutabaga) casserole that is a traditional Christmas dish in Finland. It is usually served with other casseroles at the Christmas table as a side dish to ham, fish or other meats.

Traditional lanttulaatikko is made of boiled and mashed swede, sweetened and enriched with a mixture of bread crumbs, egg, cream, treacle, butter, and seasoned with salt and various spices (such as ginger, cinnamon and nutmeg). This mixture is placed in a casserole dish, often with a decorative pattern forked over it (or topped with more bread crumbs).

See also
 List of casserole dishes
 Porkkanalaatikko
 Maksalaatikko

References

Christmas food
Finnish cuisine
Brassica dishes
Vegetarian cuisine
Casserole dishes